Varissuo (Finnish; Kråkkärret in Swedish) is a district and the largest suburb of the city of Turku, in Finland. It is located seven kilometres to the east of the city centre, and is the easternmost major suburb of Turku, bordering on the neighbouring city of Kaarina. Varissuo has 9,000 inhabitants, the majority of whom are foreign immigrants. It is thus the second largest district of Turku, after Runosmäki.

15.72% of Varissuo's population are under 15 years old, while 12.56% are over 65. Around 60% of the population speaks an immigrant language, reflecting the suburb's wide cultural variety. 90% of students at Varissuo school speak a mother tongue other than Finnish or Swedish.
The suburb was constructed from scratch on an area of previously uninhabited wetland ( in Finnish) starting in the mid-1970s as migration from rural areas to the city increased heavily in volume.

Varissuo has several schools, a library, an underground ice arena, a Lutheran church, a health centre, a post office and a social security (KELA) office. In addition, the Itäkeskus shopping centre is located in Varissuo, as well as a University of Turku teacher training school (Turun normaalikoulu) and Turku International School. As many other parts of Turku, Varissuo has many public transport connections, with frequent bus links to the city centre as well as other nearby districts and cities.

See also 
 Districts of Turku
 Districts of Turku by population

References

Districts of Turku